This is a list of notable people who have lived on Cape Breton Island.

Arts
Steve Arbuckle, actor from Donkin
The Barra MacNeils, singing group
John Beardman, abstract painter
Kate Beaton, webcomic artist from Mabou, winner of the 2009 Doug Wright Award for "Best Emerging Talent"
Nathan Bishop, singer-songwriter from Celtae
Kay Boutilier, singer, perhaps better known as "My Name is Kay"
John Allan Cameron, singer-songwriter, from Glencoe Station, credited as the "godfather" of Cape Breton's modern Celtic music revival
Ronald Caplan, historian, publisher, member of the Order of Canada
Lynn Coady, author, winner of the 2013 Scotiabank Giller Prize
Nathan Cohen, theatre critic, broadcaster, publisher
J. P. Cormier, singer-songwriter; fiddle, mandolin, banjo, guitar player; Chéticamp
Lee Cremo, fiddle player
Mark Day, film and television actor, writer, and producer
Aselin Debison, singer-songwriter
Don Domanski, poet
Carolyn Dunn, film and television actor from Whitney Pier
Winston "Scotty" Fitzgerald, fiddle player from White Point
Robert Frank, photographer
Danny Gallivan, Hockey Night in Canada sportscaster
John Gracie, singer-songwriter
Bruce Guthro, singer-songwriter
Drake Jensen, singer-songwriter
Rita Joe, Mi'kmaw poet and songwriter
Angus MacAskill, giant and circus performer
Allie MacDonald, actress
Frankie MacDonald, YouTube phenomenon and winner of the Vital Cape Breton Excellence Award
Martin MacDonald, orchestral conductor
Mitch MacDonald, singer-songwriter
Linden MacIntyre, journalist, broadcaster, novelist, winner of 2009 Giller Prize
Ashley MacIsaac, fiddle player
Daniel MacIvor, actor, playwright, theatre director and film director
Billy MacLellan, actor (Nobody, Defiance, Murdoch Mysteries)
Hugh MacLennan, Governor General's Awards-winning author
Alistair MacLeod, author
Buddy MacMaster, fiddle player
Natalie MacMaster, fiddle player
Rita MacNeil, singer-songwriter
Matt Minglewood, musician
Farley Mowat, writer, had his summer residence in Cape Breton
Scott Oake, sportscaster
Daniel Petrie, Hollywood filmmaker
The Rankin Family, singers-songwriters
Rick Ravanello, actor, Hart's War; various TV series, including 24, CSI and Desperate Housewives
A. J. Reynolds, internationally syndicated radio host
Harold Russell, Academy Award-winning actor for his portrayal of Homer Parrish in the 1946 film The Best Years of Our Lives
Gordie Sampson, singer-songwriter
Douglas September, singer-songwriter
Richard Serra, sculptor
Slowcoaster, rock band
Amy Spurway, author
Tom Fun Orchestra, rock band
Scott Turner, songwriter
Hugh MacLennan Canadian Author and professor of English at McGill University. He won five Governor General's Awards and a Royal Bank Award

Athletics
Paul Boutilier 
Norm Ferguson
Trevor Fahey
Aaron Johnson
Andrew MacDonald
Al MacInnis
Mike McPhee
Johnny Miles
Ryan Rozicki
Bobby Smith
Doug Sulliman
Kevin Morrison
Logan Shaw

Politics, the law, and business
John George Bourinot (younger), 3rd Clerk of the House of Commons (Canada)
John Buchanan, Premier of Nova Scotia
Gerald Butts, former Principal Secretary to Prime Minister Justin Trudeau
Mayann Francis, first Black Lieutenant Governor of Nova Scotia
Clarence Gillis, Member of Parliament
Ruth Goldbloom, philanthropist, member of the Order of Canada
Alasdair Graham, Senator
Gordon Sidney Harrington, Premier of Nova Scotia
Alexander Graham Bell
Angus L. MacDonald, Premier of Nova Scotia
Donald MacDonald, President of the Canadian Labour Congress and MLA
Finlay MacDonald, Senator
Rodney MacDonald, Premier of Nova Scotia
Allan MacEachen, Deputy Prime Minister, Finance Minister
Russell MacLellan, Premier of Nova Scotia
Kevin S. MacLeod, Canadian Secretary to the Queen
Donald Marshall, Jr., wrongly convicted Mi’kmaq activist
David Mathews, former Mayor of New York City under the British during the American Revolution
Elizabeth May, leader of the Green Party of Canada
John W. Morgan, Mayor of Cape Breton Regional Municipality
Robert Muir, Member of Parliament; Senator
George Henry Murray, Premier of Nova Scotia
Lisa Raitt, Conservative MP and former federal Minister of Transport, Labour and Natural Resources 
Irving Schwartz, businessman, philanthropist, member of the Order of Canada
Alexander S. Williams, NYPD officer, candidate for US Senate

Religion
Moses Coady, Roman Catholic priest, helped found the Co-operative Antigonish Movement at St. Francis Xavier University
Moses E. Kiley, Roman Catholic archbishop of the Roman Catholic Archdiocese of Milwaukee, Milwaukee, Wisconsin
Reverend Norman McLeod, Presbyterian minister, St Ann's; migrated in the 1850s with 800 settlers from surrounding communities to Waipu, New Zealand
James "Father Jimmy" Tompkins, Roman Catholic priest, helped found the Co-operative Antigonish Movement at St. Francis Xavier University

Sciences
Walter Mackenzie, Dr. - Dean of Medicine, University of Alberta, Edmonton 
Arthur B. McDonald, astrophysicist and joint winner of the 2015 Nobel Prize in Physics

Other
John Bernard Croak V.C.
Neil McLean, a New Zealand public works contractor and sportsman
Isaac Phills, Order of Canada recipient

References

Cape Breton